Boaz Kramer (born 12 January 1978) is an Israeli former professional wheelchair tennis player.

Biography
Boaz Kramer was born partially paralyzed in his left arm and both legs. At the age of five he began practicing disabled sports at the Israel Sports Center for the Disabled. He was active in wheelchair basketball and wheelchair tennis, competing internationally in tennis. Kramer also studied medicine at Tel Aviv University.

Kramer is married to Shirley Faitelson since 2008. He is a father of three children, Rommy (daughter), Suf (son) and Ofri (daughter).

Sports career
In 2012, Kramer was ranked 9th in the world in wheelchair tennis.

Towards the 2008 Paralympic Games, Kramer was chosen by the Israeli Paralympic Committee as Shraga Weinberg's partner in the wheelchair tennis doubles tournament. He competed in the singles event and was eliminated by World Number 3 Nicolas Taylor, In the doubles tournament he and Weinberg won silver.

In 2012, Kramer together with Shraga Weinberg and Noam Gershony won the Wheelchair Tennis World Team Cup.

In the London 2012 Paralympic Games Kramer reached 1/4 Final, where he lost to World Number 1 David Wagner.

Since 2011 he has served as executive director of the Israel Sport Center for the Disabled, one of the largest Disabled Sport Facilities and programs in the world.

In 2012, Kramer was elected by the Israeli Globes Magazine as one of the 40 most prominent young CEOs in the country.

References

External links
 
 
 Boaz Kramer at the Israel Sports Center for the Disabled website

1978 births
Living people
Israeli male tennis players
Wheelchair tennis players
Paralympic wheelchair tennis players of Israel
Paralympic silver medalists for Israel
Paralympic medalists in wheelchair tennis
Wheelchair tennis players at the 2008 Summer Paralympics
Medalists at the 2008 Summer Paralympics